The Senior Enlisted Advisor to the Chiefs of Staff Committee (SEAC) is the most senior member of the other ranks of the British Armed Forces. The role of the SEAC is to advise the Chiefs of Staff Committee, contribute to policy and decision making, and "bring the perspective of the Warrant Officers, Non-Commissioned Officers and Junior Ranks". The first SEAC took up the appointment on 1 November 2018.

The use of the term  enlisted in the title of the position is a departure from the usual British practice of referring to soldiers who do not hold a commission as  other ranks.

List of Senior Enlisted Advisors

See also
 Senior Enlisted Advisor to the Chairman – US Armed Forces equivalent.

References

British military appointments
Warrant officers